The bilge is the lowest compartment on a ship.

Bilge may also refer to:

 Bilge, Mardin, a Turkish village
 Bilge (name), people with the name